Vulamba is a commune of the city of Butembo in North Kivu, Democratic Republic of the Congo.

Butembo
Communes of the Democratic Republic of the Congo